Totonero may refer to:
Totonero 1980, a scandal of football match fixing in Italy in 1980
Totonero 1986, a scandal of football match fixing in Italy between 1984 and 1986